Luke McCaffrey (born April 2, 2001) is an American football wide receiver and former quarterback for the Rice Owls. He previously played at Nebraska.

Early life and high school
McCaffrey grew up in Highlands Ranch, Colorado and attended Valor Christian High School, where he played for his father. He mostly played wide receiver and defensive back during his first two years of high school while his brother, Dylan, was Valor Christian's starting quarterback. McCaffrey caught 47 passes for 717 yards and nine touchdowns as a sophomore. He split quarterbacking duties during his junior season and completed 76 percent of his passes for 878 yards with six touchdowns and three interceptions. McCaffrey passed for 2,202 yards with 21 touchdowns and four interceptions while also rushing for 526 yards and eight touchdowns as Valor Christian went undefeated and won the Class 5A state championship. McCaffrey was rated a four-star recruit committed to play college football at Nebraska over offers from Colorado, Colorado State, Michigan, Ohio State, UCLA, and Mississippi.

College career

Nebraska
McCaffrey joined the Nebraska Cornhuskers as an early enrollee. He saw his first significant playing time in a 38-31 loss to Indiana, replacing Noah Vedral following an injury and completing 5 of 6 pass attempts for 71 yards and one touchdown while also rushing 12 times for 76 yards. McCaffrey finished the season with 142 passing yards and two touchdown passes in four games while maintaining a redshirt for the year. He competed to be the Cornhuskers' starting quarterback in 2020, but Adrian Martinez was chosen to be the starter. McCaffrey made his first career start on November 14, 2020, against Penn State and completed 13 of 21 pass attempts for 152 yards and one touchdown while also rushing for 67 yards and one touchdown. He was benched in favor of Martinez after Nebraska lost 41-23 to Illinois. McCaffrey played in seven games with two starts in 2020 and completed 48 of 76 pass attempts for 466 yards and one touchdown with six interceptions and rushed 65 times for 364 yards and three touchdowns. Following the end of the season, McCaffrey entered the NCAA transfer portal.

Rice
McCaffrey initially transferred to Louisville, but left the program after several months. He ultimately enrolled at Rice. McCaffrey competed with Wiley Green for the starting quarterback job entering his first season with the team. He played in nine games with three starts. McCaffrey moved to wide receiver during spring practices in 2022. He finished the season as the Owls' leading receiver with 58 receptions for 723 yards and six touchdowns despite missing the final three games of the regular season due to an ankle injury and also rushed for 147 yards and one touchdown.

Personal life
McCaffrey's father, Ed McCaffrey, played wide receiver in the National Football League (NFL) for New York Giants, San Francisco 49ers, and Denver Broncos and was formerly the head football coach for the Northern Colorado Bears. His older brother, Christian, currently plays running back in the NFL for the San Francisco 49ers. Another brother, Max, played wide receiver at Duke and in the NFL for several teams and his brother Dylan is the starting quarterback at Northern Colorado after beginning his college career at Michigan. His maternal grandfather, Dave Sime, won a silver medal in the 100-meter dash at the 1960 Olympic Games.

References

External links
Nebraska Cornhuskers bio
Rice Owls bio

2001 births
Living people
Players of American football from Colorado
American football wide receivers
Rice Owls football players
Nebraska Cornhuskers football players
American football quarterbacks
Sportspeople from the Denver metropolitan area